Lucy Hadi (born February 1946 in Amelia Island, Florida, U.S.A.) was Secretary of the Florida Department of Children and Families. She resigned one day after being found in contempt of court for failure to place a jail inmate found incompetent to stand trial because of mental illness in a treatment facility.

Before becoming Secretary of the Department of Children and Families, she worked as senior vice president of the United Way of Northeast Florida.

References

Nassau Neighbors -  Wednesday, January 3, 2007 - Nassau native moves on from helm at state DCF - Lucy Hadi has not announced her future plans for certain.

1946 births
Living people
State cabinet secretaries of Florida
Women in Florida politics
21st-century American women